Morimus sexmaculipennis is a species of beetle in the family Cerambycidae. It was described by Stephan von Breuning in 1961. It is known from Malaysia.

References

Phrissomini
Beetles described in 1961